Cystoporata, also known as Cystoporida or cystoporates, are an extinct order of Paleozoic bryozoans in the class Stenolaemata.  Their fossils are found from Ordovician to Triassic strata.

All cystoporatan bryozoan genera (around 50 or so) have a "cystopore", a chamber-like supporting structure, separated from each other by transverse septa, situated between the characteristically elongated zooecia of each individual colony.

Families 

 Acanthoceramoporellidae (Ordovician)
 Actinotrypidae (Carboniferous-Permian)
 Anolotichiidae (Ordovician)
 Botrylloporidae (Ordovician-Devonian)
 Ceramoporidae (Ordovician-Devonian)
 Constellariidae (Ordovician-Silurian)
 Cystodictyonidae (Devonian-Permian)
 Etherellidae (Permian)
 Evactinoporidae (Carboniferous-Permian)
 Fistuliporidae (Ordovician-Permian)
 Goniocladiidae (Devonian-Permian)
 Hexagonellidae (Ordovician-Permian)
 Revalotrypidae (Ordovician)
 Rhinoporidae (Ordovician-Devonian)
 Xenotrypidae (Ordovician-Silurian)

References 

Prehistoric bryozoans
Prehistoric animal orders
Permian extinctions
Stenolaemata
Extinct bryozoans